Miljan Pupović (born February 4, 1983) is a Serbian former professional basketball player.

References

External links
  
 

1983 births
Living people
ABA League players
BC Cherkaski Mavpy players
BC Levski Sofia players
BC Yambol players
Croatian expatriate basketball people in Serbia
KK Beobanka players
KK FMP (1991–2011) players
KK Hemofarm players
KK Igokea players
KK Lavovi 063 players
KK MZT Skopje players
KK Vojvodina Srbijagas players
Leuven Bears players
OKK Spars players
Serbs of Croatia
Serbian expatriate basketball people in Belgium
Serbian expatriate basketball people in Bosnia and Herzegovina
Serbian expatriate basketball people in Bulgaria
Serbian expatriate basketball people in Iran
Serbian expatriate basketball people in North Macedonia
Serbian expatriate basketball people in Romania
Serbian expatriate basketball people in Ukraine
Serbian men's basketball players
Basketball players from Zagreb
Centers (basketball)